Moon Unit Zappa (born September 28, 1967) is an American actress, singer, and author. She is the daughter of musician Frank Zappa.

Early life
Moon Zappa was born in New York City, the eldest child of Gail (née Sloatman) and musician Frank Zappa. She has three younger siblings: Dweezil, Ahmet, and Diva. Zappa's father was of Sicilian, Greek-Arab, and French ancestry, and her mother was of German and Portuguese descent. Zappa attended Oakwood School in North Hollywood, California.

Career
Zappa first came to public attention in 1982 at the age of 14, when she appeared on her father's hit single "Valley Girl." The song featured Moon's monologue in "valleyspeak", slang terms popular with teenage girls in the San Fernando Valley, Los Angeles. "Valley Girl" was Frank Zappa's biggest hit in the United States, and popularized phrases from the lyric such as "grody to the max" and "gag me with a spoon." The song appeared on her father's 1982 album Ship Arriving Too Late to Save a Drowning Witch.

In the mid-1980s, Zappa and her brother Dweezil were frequent guest VJs on MTV. 

She sang on Dweezil's songs "My Mother Is a Space Cadet" b/w "Crunchy Water" in 1982 and "Let's Talk About It" from the album Havin' a Bad Day in 1986.

As a teenager, Zappa acted in the television series CHiPs, The Facts of Life, and the film Nightmares. While still 18, she was a technical consultant and appeared in several episodes of Fast Times. As an adult, she has worked as a stand-up comic, magazine writer, and actress, appearing in the films National Lampoon's European Vacation and Spirit of '76, the television sitcom Normal Life, and The Super Mario Bros. Super Show.

Zappa appeared as a niqab-clad Muslim woman in an episode of Curb Your Enthusiasm, as Ted Mosby's cousin Stacy in an episode of How I Met Your Mother, and on an episode ("Pampered to a Pulp") of Roseanne. In 2013, Zappa was the voice of Mrs. Lamber on FOX Broadcasting's Animation Domination High-Def series High School USA!.

In 2000, Zappa appeared as guest vocalist on Kip Winger's third solo album Songs from the Ocean Floor. She is the author of the novel America, the Beautiful, published in 2001. She has also written for The New York Times. In a 2016 interview with the Los Angeles Times, Zappa said she was working on a book about growing up in her "crazy house."

Personal life
Zappa married Paul Doucette, drummer and rhythm guitarist for American pop group Matchbox Twenty, in June 2002. They have one child, Mathilda Plum Doucette. They divorced in 2014.

Following the death of Zappa's mother, Gail, in October 2015, it was revealed that her siblings Ahmet and Diva were given control of the Zappa family trust with shares of 30% each, while Moon and her brother Dweezil were given smaller shares of 20% each. Speaking to the Los Angeles Times in 2016, Zappa called it "the most hideous shock of [her] life." As beneficiaries only, Moon and Dweezil will reportedly not receive any distributions from the trust until it is profitable—, it was in millions of dollars in debt—and must seek permission from Ahmet, the trustee, to make money from their father's music or merchandise bearing his name.

In more recent times, the Zappa siblings have legally reconciled their differences with Dweezil noting "It may be a bumpy road at times – we are a passionate Italian family – but we have decided to work toward privately discussing issues rather than using public forums and lawyers."

Filmography

Film

Television

References

External links

Zappa Family Album

1967 births
20th-century American actresses
21st-century American actresses
21st-century American comedians
Actresses from California
Actresses from New York City
American child actresses
American child singers
American women singers
American film actresses
American people of Arab descent
American people of Italian descent
American people of French descent
American people of Greek descent
American people of Portuguese descent
American stand-up comedians
American television actresses
American women comedians
American women writers
Living people
People from Greater Los Angeles
Zappa family